The Clavivox was a keyboard sound synthesizer and sequencer developed by American composer Raymond Scott beginning in 1952. He applied for a patent in December 1956 and was granted  on Feb. 3, 1959.

Scott had earlier built a theremin as a toy for his daughter Carrie. In his first Clavivox prototype, he used a theremin module built by a young Bob Moog (who was more than 25 years younger than Scott). The unit allowed the use of portamento over a 3-octave range. Scott then added amplitude envelopes, vibrato and other effects to the Clavivox.

Later Clavivox models used light shining through photographic film onto photocells as a source of control voltage to control pitch and timbre.

"A lot of the sound-producing circuitry of the Clavivox resembled very closely the first analog synthesizer my company made in the mid-'60s," Moog explained years later. "Some of the sounds are not the same, but they're close."

See also 
 ANS synthesizer
 Sound synthesis

References

External links 
Official Raymond Scott website
Bob Moog's memories of Raymond Scott

Synthesizers